The Archar or Archaritsa is a river in the western Danubian Plain of northern Bulgaria and a right tributary of the Danube. It originates in the western Balkan Mountains and is around 60 kilometres in length, with a drainage basin of 364 square kilometres. The river runs through limestone terrain and has steep banks, in certain sections up to 100 metres high. The Archar flows into the Danube at the large village of Archar in Dimovo municipality, Vidin Province. It also passes through Rayanovtsi, Rabisha, Kladorub, Ostrokaptsi, Dimovo, Lagoshevtsi and Darzhanitsa.

See also 
 Ratiaria

References
 This article is based on a translation of the article Арчар (река) from the Bulgarian Wikipedia.

Rivers of Bulgaria
Landforms of Vidin Province